Crawley Borough Council is the local authority for the borough of Crawley, in the county of West Sussex, England. The council consists of 35 councillors, either two or three for each of the 13 wards in the district. It is currently controlled by the Labour Party, led by Michael Jones. The administrative headquarters will be at the new Crawley Town Hall which is due to be completed in late 2022.

History 
Crawley Urban District had been created in 1956, the council being "Crawley Urban District Council". The district was enlarged on 1 April 1974 under the Local Government Act 1972, gaining territory ceded from the parishes of Charlwood, Horley, Slaugham and Worth, and becoming a non-metropolitan district. The reformed district was awarded borough status from its creation, allowing the chairman of the council to take the title of mayor.

See also 
 Crawley Borough Council elections

References

Non-metropolitan district councils of England
Local authorities in West Sussex
Borough Council